

The Golden Party Badge was an award authorised by Adolf Hitler in a decree in October 1933. It was a special award given to all Nazi Party members who had, as of 9 November 1933, registered numbers from 1 to 100,000 and had unbroken Party membership. The recipient's party number was inscribed on the reverse of the badge. Only 20,487 men and 1,795 women were awarded the badge on these terms. 

The Golden Party Badge was also awarded at the discretion of Hitler to certain members of the party who merited special treatment and, on 30 January each year, to persons who had shown outstanding service to the Nazi Party or State. These badges had the initials 'A.H.' and the date of the award on the reverse. Examples of such awards include to General Wilhelm Keitel for his direction of the 1938 occupation of the Sudetenland, and to Grand Admiral Karl Dönitz in 1943 for war services. 

The Golden Party Badge was the basic Nazi Party Badge with the addition of a gold wreath completely encircling the badge. The badge was awarded in two sizes: 30.5 mm for wear on service uniforms and 24 mm for wear on a suit jacket. In the event of the death of the recipient, the badge would be kept by the family. However, due to the numbered certificate, no one else was allowed to wear the badge.

Adolf Hitler's own Golden Party Badge had the number '1'. However, his actual Party number was 555, as the numbers started at 500 to make the party's membership at the time appear larger. The '1' badge was discovered by the Red Army after the capture of Berlin, and stored in the headquarters of the FSB. The badge was stolen in 2005, when guards thought a cat had set off the alarms, allowing the burglar to escape.

In the 1930s, Rudolf Hess had explored the possibility of making the Golden Nazi Party Badge the first degree of a multi-degree award of the German Order. In Hess' proposal, the Golden Nazi Party Badge would have been the lowest degree, followed by a 2nd class medal, 1st class cross, and then a Knight's Cross neck order. Hess's degrees were never instituted, but the later German Order retained the Golden Nazi Party Badge as its centerpiece.

The public wear of all Nazi Party badges, including the Golden Party Badge, was banned in 1945.

See also
 Political decorations of the Nazi Party

References 

Sources

 

Orders, decorations, and medals of Nazi Germany
1933 establishments in Germany
Awards established in 1933